Le Baron, le Baron, or LeBaron
may refer to:

 Chrysler LeBaron, a car model produced by Chrysler
 Church of the Firstborn (LeBaron order), principal enclave of the LeBaron Mormon fundamentalist group, in Galeana, Chihuahua
 LeBarón family massacre
 LeBaron Incorporated, a car design and body builder established in 1920
 The Phantom Baron (Le baron fantôme), French drama film
 Imperial Le Baron, a model of Imperial
 A lieu-dit in Ledringhem, Nord, France

People
 Alma Dayer LeBaron Sr. (1886–1951), founder of precursor to Church of the Firstborn
 Anne LeBaron (born 1953), harpist
 Benjamin LeBarón (1976–2009), anti-crime activist Galeana, Chihuahua, Mexico
 Eddie LeBaron (1930–2015), professional American NFL football player
 Emily LeBaron (1906–1983), an artist, antique dealer, art teacher and community organizer from North Hatley, Quebec, Canada
 Ervil LeBaron (1925–1981), leader of a fundamentalist Mormon polygamous cult
 Gaye LeBaron, American journalist
 Heber LeBaron, cult leader, Church of the First Born of the Lamb of God, and convicted murderer
 Joel LeBaron (1923–1972), Mormon fundamentalist leader in northern Mexico
 Louis LeBaron (1898–1989), Justice of the Territorial Supreme Court of Hawaii 
 Louise Le Baron (1874–1918), American contralto singer
 Percy LeBaron Spencer (1894–1970) is an American inventor known for inventing the microwave oven
 Richard LeBaron, United States Ambassador to Kuwait (2004–2007)
 William LeBaron, (1883–1958) American film producer
 William Le Baron Jenney (1832–1907), American architect and engineer
 William LeBaron Putnam (1835–1918), American jurist

See also 
 The Brainiac (El Baron del Terror), a 1962 Mexican film
 Baron (disambiguation)